LGA 1200 is a zero insertion force flip-chip land grid array (LGA) socket, compatible with Intel desktop processors Comet Lake (10th gen) and Rocket Lake (11th-gen) desktop CPUs, which was released in April 2020.

LGA 1200 is designed as a replacement for the LGA 1151 (known as Socket H4). LGA 1200 is a land grid array mount with 1200 protruding pins to make contact with the pads on the processor. It uses a modified design of LGA 1151, with 49 more pins on it, improving power delivery and offering support for future incremental I/O features. Pin 1 position remains the same as it was in previous generation processors, but it has shifted socket keying to left (previously it was right), making Comet Lake processors incompatible both electrically and mechanically with previous chips.

ASRock, Asus, Biostar, Gigabyte and MSI have confirmed their motherboards based on the Intel Z490 chipset support the 11th generation Intel Rocket Lake desktop CPUs. Full PCIe 4.0 support is confirmed for selected brands. ASUS did not include support to PCIe 4.0 on M.2, hindering support for PCIe gen 4.0 NVMe SSDs.

Heatsink 

The 4 holes for fastening the heatsink to the motherboard are placed in a square with a lateral length of 75 mm for Intel's sockets LGA 1156, LGA 1155, LGA 1150, LGA 1151 and LGA 1200. Cooling solutions should therefore be interchangeable.

Comet Lake chipsets (400 series) 

Memory support configuration common for all chipsets: 
 Dual channel DDR4-2666 or DDR4-2933

Rocket Lake chipsets (500 series) 
Memory support configuration common for all chipsets (except W580):
 Dual channel
 DDR4-3200 for 11th generation Rocket Lake Core i9/i7/i5 CPUs
 DDR4-2933 for 10th generation Comet Lake Core i9/i7 CPUs
 DDR4-2666 for all other CPUs
 Up to 128 GB using 32 GB modules; maximum 64 GB for the H510 chipset

W580 based motherboards support DDR4-3200 RAM in dual channel mode.

See also 
 List of Intel microprocessors
 List of Intel chipsets

References 

Intel CPU sockets
Computer-related introductions in 2020